Morisia is a monotypic genus of  ornamental plant in the family Brassicaceae. Its only species is Morisia monanthos, also called M. hypogaea. It is native to the Mediterranean islands of Corsica and Sardinia.

References

 

Brassicaceae
Monotypic Brassicaceae genera